Ludwig Auer (1881–1954) was an Austrian stage and film actor.

Filmography

References

Bibliography
 The New York Times Film Reviews, Volume 2. New York Times, 1932.

External links

1881 births
1954 deaths
Austrian male film actors
Austrian male stage actors